Cecilia Solange Ghigo (born 16 January 1995) is an Argentine footballer who plays as a defender for Boca Juniors. She was a member of the Argentina women's national team.

She appeared at the 2014 South American Games, the 2014 Copa América Femenina and the 2015 Pan American Games.

References

External links
Cecilia Ghigo at Txapeldunak.com 

1995 births
Living people
People from La Matanza Partido
Argentine women's footballers
Women's association football defenders
Boca Juniors (women) footballers
Madrid CFF players
Argentina women's international footballers
Competitors at the 2014 South American Games
South American Games gold medalists for Argentina
South American Games medalists in football
Footballers at the 2015 Pan American Games
Pan American Games competitors for Argentina
Argentine expatriate women's footballers
Argentine expatriate sportspeople in Spain
Expatriate women's footballers in Spain
Sportspeople from Buenos Aires Province